Renasak Bon (also Romanized as Renāsak Bon; also known as Rīnāsokovand) is a village in Blukat Rural District, Rahmatabad and Blukat District, Rudbar County, Gilan Province, Iran. At the 2006 census, its population was 87, in 14 families.

References 

Populated places in Rudbar County